Alfred Lapointe (9 April 1835 – 30 October 1915) was a farmer, miller and political figure in Quebec. He represented Vaudreuil in the Legislative Assembly of Quebec from 1884 to 1890 as a Conservative.

He was born Alfred Godard in Sainte-Thérèse, Lower Canada, the son of Jean-Marie Godard and Émilie Tremblay, and educated at the Collège de Sainte-Thérèse. Lapointe owned flour and sawmills. He was a justice of the peace and a commissioner for the trial of small causes. Lapointe was mayor of Sainte-Justine-de-Newton in 1876, from 1881 to 1885 and from 1903 to 1906. He was married twice: to Marie Antoinette Léontine Tessier in 1868 and to Susanna Towner in 1878. He ran unsuccessfully for a seat in the House of Commons in 1872, 1882 and again in 1900. He was first elected to the Quebec assembly in an 1884 by-election held after the election of François-Xavier Archambault was overturned. He was reelected in 1886 but defeated when he ran again in 1890.

References
 

1835 births
1915 deaths
Conservative Party of Quebec MNAs
Mayors of places in Quebec
Canadian justices of the peace